Ben or Benjamin Harvey may refer to:
Benjamin Harvey, English shopkeeper and founder of the predecessor of Harvey Nichols
Ben Harvey (rugby union) (born 1974), English rugby union player and coach
Ben Harvey (American radio personality), Sirius XM presenter and podcaster
Ben Harvey (Australian radio personality), Triple J presenter